"Brokenhearted" is the fifth single by English pop rock band Lawson featuring guest vocals from the American rapper B.o.B. It was released as the lead single from the re-issue of their debut studio album, Chapman Square (2012). The song was released on the United Kingdom on 7 July 2013, via Polydor Records. It debuted and peaked at number six on the UK Singles Chart. In the Republic of Ireland, the song reached number 12, becoming their highest charting single to date in the country. It was added to the BBC Radio 1 and BBC Radio 2 playlists.

Background
Speaking of the song, lead singer Andy Brown stated: "Brokenhearted is definitely a bit of a turning point for us as a band. It's my favourite song we have recorded to this day."

Music video

The music video was directed by Declan Whitebloom. It follows a mystery female in her mission to bury the memory of an ex, climaxing in a performance from the band and B.o.B at a private party at a luxury house in the Hollywood Hills.

Track listing
 Digital download
 "Brokenhearted" (featuring B.o.B) - 3:29

 Digital download - EP
 "Brokenhearted" (No rap version) - 3:20
 "Brokenhearted" (Acoustic) - 3:29
 "Brokenhearted" (Steve Smart & Westfunk Radio Edit) - 2:49
 "Brokenhearted" (Seamus Haji Radio Edit) - 3:28
 "Brokenhearted" (Queenie & Duke Remix) - 3:46
 "Don't You Worry Child" (Live) - 5:23

 CD single
 "Brokenhearted" (featuring B.o.B) - 3:29
 "Don't You Worry Child" (Live) - 5:23

 7" vinyl
 "Brokenhearted" (featuring B.o.B) - 3:29
 "Brokenhearted" (Seamus Haji Radio Edit) - 3:27

Charts

Release history

References

2013 songs
Lawson (band) songs
B.o.B songs
Polydor Records singles
2013 singles
Songs written by B.o.B
Songs written by Ki Fitzgerald